Melnica is a former village in Municipality of Prilep, North Macedonia. There are no traces of the village today

References

Villages in Prilep Municipality